The 2019 Indian general election were held in Madhya Pradesh in 4 phases- between 29 April and 19 May 2019 to constitute the 17th Lok Sabha. Results declared on 23 May 2019.

Results

Party wise

Results- Constituency wise

Assembly segments wise lead of parties

Candidates

References

Indian general elections in Madhya Pradesh
2010s in Madhya Pradesh
Madhya Pradesh